Abdul Rahim Ishak (25 July 192518 January 2001), also known as Encik Rahim, was a Singaporean politician and journalist. The youngest brother of Yusof bin Ishak, the first President of Singapore, Abdul was Minister of State for Education from 1965 to 1968 and the Minister of State for Foreign Affairs for 1968 to 1972. He was the Ambassador Extraordinary and Plenipotentiary first to the United Arab Republic in 1968, to Yugoslavia, Ethiopia, and Lebanon in 1969, and to Indonesia from 1974 to 1978. He became an envoy to New Zealand in July 1981.

Early life
Born 25 July 1925 in Singapore, Abdul received his education at King Edward VII School in Perak and Raffles College in Singapore, and was eligible to be a teacher. He worked as a news journalist for the Utusan Melayu from 1947 to 1959.

Career and personal life
Abdul served as Ambassador Extraordinary and Plenipotentiary first to the United Arab Republic in 1968, to Yugoslavia, Ethiopia, and Lebanon in 1969, and to Indonesia from 1974 to 1978. He became an envoy to New Zealand in July 1981, succeeding Lee Khoon Choy. He succeeded Chan Keng Howe as High Commissioner to New Zealand officially on 12 July 1981. His spouse Cik Mawan Wajid Khan was the president of the Siglap Women's Association. They had six children; they had at least one daughter, Lily Zubaidah Rahim.

Later life and death
Abdul retired from his political career in 1987 and was rarely seen in public. In December 2000, he was hospitalised for treatment. He died on 18 January 2001 from an unspecified illness. Many leaders in Asia offered their condolences.

References

1925 births
2001 deaths
People's Action Party politicians
Members of the Dewan Rakyat
Members of the Legislative Assembly of Singapore